Lloyd Sisco (born July 16, 1941) was an American football coach. From 1968 through 1981, Sisco served as head coach at Waco High School in Olds, Iowa where he compiled an overall record of 121 wins and fifteen losses during his fourteen-year tenure with the Warriors (121–15). He then moved on to serve as the head coach at Ellsworth Community College where he won the 1987 NJCAA National Championship and compiled an overall record of 69 wins, thirteen losses and one tie (69–13–1) during his eight-year tenure. From Ellsworth, Sisco served as the head football coach at the Livingston State College (now the University of West Alabama) from 1991 to 1993. During his three seasons there, he compiled an overall record of thirteen wins, sixteen losses  and one tie (13–16–1). From Livingston, Sisco continued his coaching career at the high school level. He was the head football coach of Van Buren County High School, Located in Keosauqua, Iowa. He left due to a situation with the superintendent of Van Buren County High School, She wanted credit for the weight room equipment he got by himself. Later in his career Sisco assistant coached for Eddyville-Blakesburg-Fremont highschool from 2020-2021 and led them to 5-11 record over those two years.

Head coaching record

College

References

1941 births
Living people
Buena Vista University alumni
High school football coaches in Iowa
Junior college football coaches in the United States
Truman State University alumni
West Alabama Tigers football coaches